Tejay Anthony Antone (born December 5, 1993) is an American professional baseball pitcher for the Cincinnati Reds of Major League Baseball (MLB).

Amateur career
Antone attended Mansfield Legacy High School in Mansfield, Texas. Antone was drafted by the New York Mets in the 22nd round of the 2012 MLB draft, but did not sign and attended Texas Christian University. He appeared in 6 games for the TCU Horned Frogs in 2013. Antone transferred to Weatherford College for the 2014 season, going 7–6 with a 2.88 ERA over  innings. Antone was drafted by the Cincinnati Reds in the 5th round, with the 155th overall selection, of the 2014 MLB draft.

Professional career
Antone split the 2014 season between the Arizona League Reds and the Billings Mustangs, going a combined 2–3 with a 5.76 ERA over  innings. He spent the 2015 season with the Dayton Dragons, going 6–10 with a 2.91 ERA over 158 innings. He split the 2016 season between the Daytona Tortugas and the Louisville Bats, going a combined 14–7 with a 3.45 ERA over  innings. He missed the 2017 season after undergoing Tommy John surgery. He spent the 2018 season with Daytona, going 14–6 with a 3.51 ERA over  innings. Antone split the 2019 season between the Chattanooga Lookouts and Louisville, going a combined 11–12 with a 4.00 ERA over  innings. 

Antone was added to the Reds 40–man roster after the 2019 season. He made his major league debut on July 27, 2020, giving up one run in  innings of work against the Chicago Cubs. In 2020, Antone went 0–3 with a 2.80 ERA in 13 appearances (four starts), spanning . 

In 2021, Antone spent most of the season on the IL with a forearm injury, making 23 appearances with a 2.14 ERA spanning . In August, he announced on Twitter that he would undergo his second Tommy John surgery. Antone missed the 2022 season recovering from the injury.

On February 7, 2023, Antone received a platelet-rich plasma injection to treat a flexor strain in his forearm, causing him to miss the beginning of the 2023 season.

Personal life
Antone and his wife, Kelsi, married in September 2019.

References

External links

Weatherford Coyotes bio

1993 births
Arizona League Reds players
Baseball players from Texas
Billings Mustangs players
Chattanooga Lookouts players
Cincinnati Reds players
Dayton Dragons players
Daytona Tortugas players
Living people
Louisville Bats players
Major League Baseball pitchers
People from Mansfield, Texas
TCU Horned Frogs baseball players
Weatherford Coyotes baseball players